Wim Gupffert ( – ) was a Dutch footballer. He was part of the Netherlands national football team, playing 3 matches and scoring 2 goals. He played his first match on 9 June 1919, a friendly match against Sweden where he scored one goal. Two other Ajax players debuted in this match as well, namely Theo Brokmann and Henk Hordijk. On club level he played for Blauw-Wit and Ajax. He scored 3 goals in 5 matches during the 1916-17 KNVB Cup.

Personal life
Wim was born in Amsterdam, the son of Johan Gupffert and Johanna Jacomina Melchers. He was married to Aaltje Visser.

Career statistics

Sources

See also
 List of Dutch international footballers

References

1894 births
1958 deaths
Dutch footballers
Netherlands international footballers
Blauw-Wit Amsterdam players
AFC Ajax players
Footballers from Amsterdam
Association football forwards